The Sierpiński triangle (sometimes spelled Sierpinski), also called the Sierpiński gasket or Sierpiński sieve,  is a fractal attractive fixed set with the overall shape of an equilateral triangle, subdivided recursively into smaller equilateral triangles. Originally constructed as a curve, this is one of the basic examples of self-similar sets—that is, it is a mathematically generated pattern that is reproducible at any magnification or reduction. It is named after the Polish mathematician Wacław Sierpiński, but appeared as a decorative pattern many centuries before the work of Sierpiński.

Constructions 
There are many different ways of constructing the Sierpinski triangle.

Removing triangles 

The Sierpinski triangle may be constructed from an equilateral triangle by repeated removal of triangular subsets:
 Start with an equilateral triangle.
 Subdivide it into four smaller congruent equilateral triangles and remove the central triangle.
 Repeat step 2 with each of the remaining smaller triangles infinitely.

Each removed triangle (a trema) is topologically an open set.
This process of recursively removing triangles is an example of a finite subdivision rule.

Shrinking and duplication 

The same sequence of shapes, converging to the Sierpiński triangle, can alternatively be generated by the following steps:
Start with any triangle in a plane (any closed, bounded region in the plane will actually work).  The canonical Sierpiński triangle uses an equilateral triangle with a base parallel to the horizontal axis (first image).
Shrink the triangle to  height and  width, make three copies, and position the three shrunken triangles so that each triangle touches the two other triangles at a corner (image 2). Note the emergence of the central hole—because the three shrunken triangles can between them cover only  of the area of the original. (Holes are an important feature of Sierpinski's triangle.)
Repeat step 2 with each of the smaller triangles (image 3 and so on).

Note that this infinite process is not dependent upon the starting shape being a triangle—it is just clearer that way. The first few steps starting, for example, from a square also tend towards a Sierpinski triangle. Michael Barnsley used an image of a fish to illustrate this in his paper "V-variable fractals and superfractals."

The actual fractal is what would be obtained after an infinite number of iterations.  More formally, one describes it in terms of functions on closed sets of points.  If we let dA denote the dilation by a factor of  about a point A, then the Sierpiński triangle with corners A, B, and C is the fixed set of the transformation dA ∪ dB ∪ dC.

This is an attractive fixed set, so that when the operation is applied to any other set repeatedly, the images converge on the Sierpiński triangle.  This is what is happening with the triangle above, but any other set would suffice.

Chaos game 

If one takes a point and applies each of the transformations dA, dB, and dC to it randomly, the resulting points will be dense in the Sierpiński triangle, so the following algorithm will again generate arbitrarily close approximations to it:

Start by labeling p1, p2 and p3 as the corners of the Sierpinski triangle, and a random point v1. Set , where rn is a random number 1, 2 or 3. Draw the points v1 to v∞. If the first point v1 was a point on the Sierpiński triangle, then all the points vn lie on the Sierpiński triangle. If the first point v1 to lie within the perimeter of the triangle is not a point on the Sierpiński triangle, none of the points vn will lie on the Sierpiński triangle, however they will converge on the triangle. If v1 is outside the triangle, the only way vn will land on the actual triangle, is if vn is on what would be part of the triangle, if the triangle was infinitely large.

Or more simply:
 Take three points in a plane to form a triangle.
 Randomly select any point inside the triangle and consider that your current position.
 Randomly select any one of the three vertex points.
 Move half the distance from your current position to the selected vertex.
 Plot the current position.
 Repeat from step 3.

This method is also called the chaos game, and is an example of an iterated function system. You can start from any point outside or inside the triangle, and it would eventually form the Sierpiński Gasket with a few leftover points (if the starting point lies on the outline of the triangle, there are no leftover points). With pencil and paper, a brief outline is formed after placing approximately one hundred points, and detail begins to appear after a few hundred.

Arrowhead construction of Sierpiński gasket 

Another construction for the Sierpinski gasket shows that it can be constructed as a curve in the plane. It is formed by a process of repeated modification of simpler curves, analogous to the construction of the Koch snowflake:
 Start with a single line segment in the plane
 Repeatedly replace each line segment of the curve with three shorter segments, forming 120° angles at each junction between two consecutive segments, with the first and last segments of the curve either parallel to the original line segment or forming a 60° angle with it.

At every iteration, this construction gives a continuous curve. In the limit, these approach a curve that traces out the Sierpinski triangle by a single continuous directed (infinitely wiggly) path, which is called the Sierpinski arrowhead. In fact, the aim of the original article by Sierpinski of 1915, was to show an example of a curve (a Cantorian curve), as the title of the article itself declares.

Cellular automata 
The Sierpinski triangle also appears in certain cellular automata (such as Rule 90), including those relating to Conway's Game of Life. For instance, the Life-like cellular automaton B1/S12 when applied to a single cell will generate four approximations of the Sierpinski triangle. A very long one cell thick line in standard life will create two mirrored Sierpiński triangles. The time-space diagram of a replicator pattern in a cellular automaton also often resembles a Sierpiński triangle, such as that of the common replicator in HighLife. The Sierpinski triangle can also be found in the Ulam-Warburton automaton and the Hex-Ulam-Warburton automaton.

Pascal's triangle

If one takes Pascal's triangle with  rows and colors the even numbers white, and the odd numbers black, the result is an approximation to the Sierpiński triangle.  More precisely, the limit as  approaches infinity of this parity-colored -row Pascal triangle is the Sierpinski triangle.

Towers of Hanoi
The Towers of Hanoi puzzle involves moving disks of different sizes between three pegs, maintaining the property that no disk is ever placed on top of a smaller disk. The states of an -disk puzzle, and the allowable moves from one state to another, form an undirected graph, the Hanoi graph, that can be represented geometrically as the intersection graph of the set of triangles remaining after the th step in the construction of the Sierpinski triangle. Thus, in the limit as  goes to infinity, this sequence of graphs can be interpreted as a discrete analogue of the Sierpinski triangle.

Properties
For integer number of dimensions , when doubling a side of an object,  copies of it are created, i.e. 2 copies for 1-dimensional object, 4 copies for 2-dimensional object and 8 copies for 3-dimensional object. For the Sierpiński triangle, doubling its side creates 3 copies of itself.

The area of a Sierpiński triangle is zero (in Lebesgue measure).

The points of a Sierpinski triangle have a simple characterization in barycentric coordinates. If a point has barycentric coordinates , expressed as binary numerals, then the point is in Sierpiński's triangle if and only if  for

Generalization to other moduli
A generalization of the Sierpiński triangle can also be generated using Pascal's triangle if a different modulus  is used. Iteration  can be generated by taking a Pascal's triangle with  rows and coloring numbers by their value modulo . As  approaches infinity, a fractal is generated.

The same fractal can be achieved by dividing a triangle into a tessellation of  similar triangles and removing the triangles that are upside-down from the original, then iterating this step with each smaller triangle.

Conversely, the fractal can also be generated by beginning with a triangle and duplicating it and arranging  of the new figures in the same orientation into a larger similar triangle with the vertices of the previous figures touching, then iterating that step.

Analogues in higher dimensions

The Sierpinski tetrahedron or tetrix is the three-dimensional analogue of the Sierpiński triangle, formed by repeatedly shrinking a regular tetrahedron to one half its original height, putting together four copies of this tetrahedron with corners touching, and then repeating the process.

A tetrix constructed from an initial tetrahedron of side-length  has the property that the total surface area remains constant with each iteration. The next iteration consists of four copies with side length , so the total area is  again. Subsequent iterations again quadruple the number of copies and halve the side length, preserving the overall area. Meanwhile, the volume of the construction is halved at every step and therefore approaches zero. The limit of this process has neither volume nor surface but, like the Sierpinski gasket, is an intricately connected curve. If all points are projected onto a plane that is parallel to two of the outer edges, they exactly fill a square of side length  without overlap.

History
Wacław Sierpiński described the Sierpiński triangle in 1915. However, similar patterns appear already as a common motif of 13th-century Cosmatesque inlay stonework.

The Apollonian gasket was first described by Apollonius of Perga (3rd century BC) and further analyzed by Gottfried Leibniz (17th century), and is a curved precursor of the 20th-century Sierpiński triangle.

Etymology

The usage of the word "gasket" to refer to the Sierpiński triangle refers to gaskets such as are found in motors, and which sometimes feature a series of holes of decreasing size, similar to the fractal; this usage was coined by Benoit Mandelbrot, who thought the fractal looked similar to "the part that prevents leaks in motors".

See also
 Apollonian gasket, a set of mutually tangent circles with the same combinatorial structure as the Sierpinski triangle
 List of fractals by Hausdorff dimension
 Sierpiński carpet, another fractal named after Sierpiński and formed by repeatedly removing squares from a larger square
 Triforce, a relic in the Legend of Zelda series

References

External links

 
 
 
 Sierpinski Gasket by Trema Removal at cut-the-knot
 Sierpinski Gasket and Tower of Hanoi at cut-the-knot
 Real-time GPU generated Sierpinski Triangle in 3D
 Pythagorean triangles, Waclaw Sierpinski, Courier Corporation, 2003
 A067771    Number of vertices in Sierpiński triangle of order n. at OEIS
 Interactive version of the chaos game

Factorial and binomial topics
Curves
Topological spaces
Types of triangles
Cellular automaton patterns
Science and technology in Poland
L-systems